Rachel Jewkes is Executive Scientist: Research Strategy in Office of the President and former Unit Director of the Gender and Health Unit of the South Africa Medical Research Council, based in Pretoria, South Africa. She also serves as Director of the What Works to Prevent Violence Global Programme, as well as of the Secretary of the Sexual Violence Research Initiative. She has been a member of the National Council Against Gender-Based Violence in South Africa and the PEPFAR Scientific Advisory Board  and the WHO's Strategic and Technical Advisory Committee for HIV-AIDS (STAC-HIV). Jewkes studied Medicine, receiving a Masters in Community Medicine (MSc) and a Doctorate in Medicine (MD) from the London School of Hygiene & Tropical Medicine, University of London. She is an Honorary Professor in the faculty of Health Sciences, School of Public Health at the University of Witwatersrand, Johannesburg, and is an A-rated researcher with the South African National Research Foundation. Jewkes moved from England to South Africa in 1994.

Recent research 
A UN-sponsored study coauthored by Jewkes on male violence against women in Asia and the Pacific reported that a high number of men admitted to sexual violence. Survey researchers have questioned the plausibility of some of the findings of this study. In 2013 Jewkes also published on depressive symptoms after sexual assault, the epidemiology of child homicides and intimate femicide-suicide.

Publications

Sexual violence

Homicide and femicide

Women's health 
 
  Pdf.

References 

Living people
South African women scientists
21st-century women scientists
South African public health doctors
Alumni of the London School of Hygiene & Tropical Medicine
Year of birth missing (living people)
Women public health doctors